Mauro Berruto (born 8 May 1969) is an Italian volleyball head coach.

Career as coach
Born in Turin, Berruto graduated in philosophy and started his career in volley with CUS Torino Pallavolo in 1994. In 2001 he was engaged by Copra Piacenza, which he led to Serie A1, Italy's top volleyball club league, for the first time. After coaching  at Parma (2003-2004) and Macerata (2004-2005) in the same league,  he became head coach of Finland men's national volleyball team, a position he held until 2010; in 2005-2006 he also coached   Sempre Volley Padua in A1. In 2007-2008 he coached Panathinaikos V.C. in Greece, while the fellowing year he returned to Italy's Serie 1 as head coach of Gabeca Montichiari (2008-2010), moving to  Lube Macerata in 2010-2011.

In 2010 he was head coach of Italy men's national volleyball team. In 2011 his national team achieved the silver medal in the European Championship. On August 12, 2012  Italy  defeated Bulgaria to gain the bronze medal in the 20120 Olympic Games at London. At the World League 2013 his team achieved bronze, while in the same year European Championships he led the Italian team to the second consecutive silver medal in the tournament. At the World League 2014 Italy qualified to the final round, held in Florence, gaining another bronze medal.

Just before the final round of the 2015 World League he sent home four players (Zaytsev, Travica, Sabbi and Randazzo) because of insubordination. After his team took 5th place in the World League finals held in Rio de Janeiro, on July 29, 2015 he resigned as coach of the Italian national team.

Awards

 2005  CEV Challenge Cup, with Lube Banca Macerata
 2008  Greek Cup, with Panathinaikos Athens
 2011  CEV Challenge Cup, with Lube Banca Macerata
 2011  CEV European Championship
 2012  Olympic Games
 2013  FIVB World League
 2013  CEV European Championship
 2013  FIVB World Grand Champions Cup
 2014  FIVB World League

References

1969 births
Living people
Sportspeople from Turin
Italian volleyball coaches
Volleyball coaches of international teams
Panathinaikos V.C. coaches